Insha'Allah (English: God Willing) is a 2009 Pakistani short drama film directed by Khurram Mahmood. The Film was written by Jonathan James and produced by Catherine Marcus. The film stars Mehwish Hayat, Mohib Mirza, Saife Hassan and Rashid Farooqui. The Film was nominated for 6 Awards and won 5 Awards. Mohib Mirza won Kara Film Festival Award for Best Supporting Actor.

Plot
Set in modern-day Pakistan in the city of Karachi, the film story involves around a young couple Farhan (Mohib Mirza) and Sahar (Mehwish Hayat) and their new born daughter and the struggles they encounter in their lives. 'Insha'Allah' challenges audiences to address head on the issues of people smuggling, whilst seeing the effects it has on the people involved or left behind. It also highlights the effects of Gambling. Unlike reading news articles and press releases from charities and aid agencies, 'Insha'Allah' puts faces and emotions to the people affected, albeit in a fictional context.

Cast
 Mehwish Hayat    as Sahar
 Mohib Mirza 	   as Farhan
 Saife Hassan 	   as Javaid
 Rashid Farooqui   as Abbas Shan
 Mosa Raza 	   as Iyesa  
 Seema Ghazal

Awards
  Accolade Competition 2009 Won Award of Merit 	Khurrum M. Sultan
  Asheville Film Festival 2009 Nominated Best Film 	Khurrum M. Sultan
  CINE Competition 2009WonCINE Golden Eagle  Student Division: Entertainment - Drama:- Khurrum M. Sultan
  Columbus International Film & Video Festival 2009 Won Honorable Mention ==Student Division:- Khurrum M. Sultan
  Las Vegas International Film Festival 2009 Won Golden Ace Award 	Short Film
  Khurrum M. Sultan (director)
  Gold Lion Films (production company)
 Kara Film Festival Award for Best Supporting Actor:- Mohib Mirza

References

Pakistani short films
2000s Urdu-language films
Urdu-language Pakistani films